The 2014 season is Independiente's first season back in the Primera División, following one season in the Primera B Nacional.  Independiente this season going to play in the Argentine Primera División and be Continue Copa Argentina.

Current squad

Last updated on 16 October 2014

Players out on loan

Transfers

{|class="wikitable"
|+
! style="background-color:white; color:black;" scope="col"|Position
! style="background-color:white; color:black;" scope="col"|Staff
|-

Friendlies

Competitions

Primera División

Season review

League table

Results summary

Results by round

Copa Argentina

Squad statistics

Updated on 19 October 2014

Goals

Assists

Disciplinary record

Penalties

Overall
{| class="wikitable" style="text-align: center"
|-
!
!Total
!Home
!Away
!Naturel
|-
|align=left| Games played          || 16 || 8 || 6 || 2
|-
|align=left| Games won             || 9 || 5 || 3 || 1
|-
|align=left| Games drawn           || 2 || 1 || 1 || 0
|-
|align=left| Games lost            || 5 || 2 || 2 || 1
|-
|align=left| Biggest win           || 3-0 vs Atlético Rafaela || 3-0 vs Atlético Rafaela || 2-1 vs Olimpo 1-0 vs Banfield || 2-0 vs Belgrano 
|-
|align=left| Biggest loss          || 0-4 vs Vélez Sarsfield || 0-4 vs Vélez Sarsfield || 1-4 vs River Plate || -
|-
|align=left| Biggest win (League)  || 3-0 vs Atlético Rafaela || 3-0 vs Atlético Rafaela || 2-1 vs Olimpo 2-1 vs San Lorenzo 1-0 vs Banfield || 
|-
|align=left| Biggest win (Cup)    || 2-0 vs Belgrano || - || - || 2-0 vs Belgrano
|-
|align=left| Biggest loss (League) || 0-4 vs Vélez Sarsfield || 0-4 vs Vélez Sarsfield ||  1-4 vs River Plate || -
|-
|align=left| Biggest loss (Cup)    || 0-2 vs Estudiantes  || - || - || 0-2 vs Estudiantes
|-
|align=left| Clean sheets          || 4 || 2 || 1 || 1
|-
|align=left| Goals scored          || 26 || 16 || 8 || 2
|-
|align=left| Goals conceded        || 22 || 11 || 9 || 2
|-
|align=left| Goal difference       || 4 || 5 || -1 || 0
|-
|-
|-
|align=left| Yellow cards         || 33 || 10 || 20 || 3
|-
|align=left| Red cards            || 2 || 1 || 1 || 0
|-
|align=left| Most appearances     || align=left|  Diego Rodríguez  Federico Mancuello (16)   || colspan=3|– 
|-
|align=left| Most minutes played  || align=left|  Diego Rodríguez (1,440) || colspan=3|–
|-
|align=left| Most goals           || align=left|  Federico Mancuello (9) || colspan=3|–
|-
|align=left| Winning rate         || % || % || % || %
|-

References

External links
 Club Atlético Independiente official web site 

Ind
Club Atlético Independiente seasons